Someone is a contemporary fiction (mystery) novel written by A.M. Edwards and published in 2014 by Fire and Ice, USA. The book already features on several best new release and library websites, including James Cook University.

Plot
Someone is the story of Titch, who grew up amid a hostile family environment with only his guitar for a friend. As he became a more accomplished guitar player he began to write his own material and despite he reluctance to step into the limelight he performed publicly for the first time as a teenager. This performance did not prove to be a resounding success due to heckling from a familiar face in the crowd. Nevertheless, he made a decision to leave home and start a career as a musician. However, a tragic and spiteful event struck him down and he needed all his resolve to find a new way to realize him dream of stardom. He decided to adopt the persona of 'Someone' and eventually went on to become a rock superstar in the US and the UK. Five years later he disappeared in the middle of a US concert series at the height of his success, never to be heard from again.

This is Titch's story of becoming Someone and of the reporter determined to piece together the circumstances of his disappearance and find out whatever happened to him.

References

2014 American novels
Novels about music